Trimmu Barrage is a barrage on the River Chenab in the Jhang District of the Punjab province of Pakistan. It is situated downstream of the confluence of the River Jhelum and River Chenab. It is situated some 25 km from the city of Jhang near the city of Atharan Hazari where the River Jhelum flows into the River Chenab. It was one of the 7 link canals to be built under the Indus Water Plan of Pakistan. Pakistan created this plan after Indus Water Treaty

Trimmu Barrage is used to control water flow into the River Chenab for irrigation and flood control purposes.

Trimmu Barrage was constructed between 1937 and 1939 by English engineers. Its name was changed later.  Primarily as a flood control mechanism to protect the city of Jhang from floods. The arched grid iron's bridge section is integrated with several protective bands.
This barrage is undergone several Upgradation like new gates construction, previous gates maintaince. 
LTV is allowed at specific hours while HTV is Completely ban till completion of Barrage 30 June 2020.Now the traffic is open for HTV and LTV. Head is reconstructed, with new bridges on the river.

See also
 List of barrages and headworks in Pakistan
 List of dams and reservoirs in Pakistan

References

Irrigation in Pakistan
Jhang District
Dams on the Jhelum River
Dams on the Chenab River
Dams completed in 1939
Dams in Pakistan